Mary Elizabeth Ellis (born May 11, 1979) is an American actress, best known for her recurring roles as The Waitress on the FX comedy It's Always Sunny in Philadelphia (2005–present), Nick's ex-girlfriend Caroline in the Fox sitcom New Girl (2011–2018) and Lisa Palmer on the Netflix horror-comedy Santa Clarita Diet (2017–2019). Ellis also starred as Amy in the shortlived NBC sitcom Perfect Couples (2010–2011) and Debbie Sanderson in the Fox sitcom The Grinder (2015–2016). Most recently, she played Gary's mother Anita in Paul Thomas Anderson's Licorice Pizza (2021).

Early life 
Ellis was born in Laurel, Mississippi. She graduated from Southern Methodist University in 2002.

Career 
Since the first season began airing in 2005, Ellis has been mostly widely known for her role as The Waitress, the object of Charlie Kelly's unrequited infatuation and obsession, on the FX/FXX comedy series It's Always Sunny in Philadelphia (2005–present). Ellis and her It's Always Sunny colleague Artemis Pebdani are members of the Los Angeles-based performance group Discount Cruise to Hell. Together, they wrote and starred in the stage show Mother May I Dance with Mary Jane's Fist?: A Lifetime Original Play at the Upright Citizens Brigade Theater in Los Angeles, California.

Ellis has also appeared in a number of other television series, including Reno 911!, House M.D., Without a Trace, Cold Case, New Girl, Happy Endings, and Netflix's Santa Clarita Diet and music videos including "Diaper Money" (2013) for The Lonely Island and "Anti-Hero" (2022) for Taylor Swift. She was a series regular on the NBC romantic comedy series Perfect Couples, which ran for one season in 2011. In 2015, she landed her first main role as Debbie Sanderson, co-starring with Fred Savage and Rob Lowe in The Grinder.

In 2008, Ellis co-wrote and starred as Olive in the independent film A Quiet Little Marriage. In 2020, she appeared in Disney's Godmothered. The following year, she appeared in Licorice Pizza (2021) as Momma Anita.

Personal life 
Ellis and Charlie Day met in 2001 and began dating immediately. They have since had an extensive history of appearing on shows together. In 2004, they auditioned together as incestuous siblings for Reno 911! and landed the roles. Around the same time, Ellis also began playing The Waitress in home movies Day was making and co-starring in (as Charlie Kelly who stalks her) with their friends Rob McElhenney and Glenn Howerton. These would go on to form the pilot episode of the dark comedy It's Always Sunny in Philadelphia in 2005 and Ellis continues to appear on the series to date.

Ellis and Day got married on March 4, 2006. Their first child, a boy named Russell Wallace Day, was born on December 15, 2011.

Filmography

Film

Television

Web

Music videos

Theatre

References

External links 

"The Days of Disco" interview with Mary Elizabeth Ellis and Charlie Day on MonsterFresh.com

Living people
21st-century American actresses
Actresses from Mississippi
American film actresses
American stage actresses
American television actresses
American women comedians
People from Laurel, Mississippi
Southern Methodist University alumni
21st-century American comedians
1979 births